David Philip Hirsch VC (28 December 1896 – 23 April 1917) was a British Army officer during World War I and recipient of the Victoria Cross, the highest and most prestigious award for gallantry in the face of the enemy that can be awarded to British and Commonwealth forces.

Details
Hirsch was born 28 December 1896 to Harry and Edith Hirsch of Weetwood Grove, Leeds.

He was 20 years old, and an Acting Captain in the 4th Battalion, The Yorkshire Regiment (Alexandra, Princess of Wales's Own), British Army during the First World War. On 23 April 1917 near Wancourt, France, he performed a deed for which he was awarded the Victoria Cross. He died in action that day.

Citation

The medal
His Victoria Cross is displayed at the Green Howards Regimental Museum, Richmond, North Yorkshire, England.

References

1896 births
1917 deaths
Green Howards officers
British military personnel killed in World War I
British World War I recipients of the Victoria Cross
British Army personnel of World War I
People from Weetwood
British Army recipients of the Victoria Cross
Military personnel from Leeds